The Lion was a brass era automobile built in Adrian, Michigan, United States by the Lion Motor Car Company from 1909 to 1912.

History 
The Lion Motor Car Company was formed to produce the engine developed for the Gyroscope automobile. This plan was abandoned and the Lion was a four-cylinder 40 hp engine model called the Forty. In 1910 Runabout and Tourers were medium-priced at $1,500 and $1,600, . Lion advertised " The Lion Forty runs like a Sixty".

A fire on June 2, 1912, destroyed the factory and 150 cars, including a prototype model Thirty.  The city of Adrian and citizens raised $8,000 to help, but the Lion Motor Car Company was under-insured and went into receivership by October.

Two Lion examples are known to be extant; one in a museum in Adrian, Michigan and another in Australia.

References

Defunct motor vehicle manufacturers of the United States
Motor vehicle manufacturers based in Michigan
Adrian, Michigan
Defunct manufacturing companies based in Michigan
Brass Era vehicles
1910s cars
Vehicle manufacturing companies established in 1910
Vehicle manufacturing companies disestablished in 1912
Cars introduced in 1910